KANW (89.1 FM) is a non-commercial public radio station in Albuquerque, New Mexico. KANW is owned and operated by the Albuquerque Public Schools. On weekdays it airs New Mexico music and local public radio programming afternoons and nights, with NPR news programming in the morning, including Morning Edition, Fresh Air, On Point and 1A. Weekends feature New Mexico music, classical music and classic country music, as well as some NPR weekend shows such as The New Yorker Radio Hour, Wait, Wait, Don't Tell Me and The Moth Radio Hour.

A second radio service known as KANW-HD2 carries all news and information programming. It is heard on KANW's digital subchannel as well as on three FM translator stations and KANM 90.3 FM in Grants.

KANW main channel programming is simulcast on KANR 91.9 in Santa Rosa, KGGA 88.1 in Gallup, KIDS 88.1 in Grants, KEDP 91.1 in Las Vegas, and KXNM 88.7 in Encino.

History
In October 1950, KANW first signed on the air. It is the oldest FM radio station in New Mexico. It was founded to air classroom educational broadcasts for students in the Albuquerque Public Schools and as a training ground for students who might be interested in broadcasting careers.

In late 2016, KANW acquired two stations from the Educational Media Foundation, a Christian radio network based in Rocklin, California. These are KANM (formerly KDRI) 90.3 in Grants and KGGA 88.1 in Gallup, New Mexico. Both stations are former Air 1 outlets, which had broadcast Contemporary Christian music. The acquisition gave KANW two stations in the Grants area. KIDS already had been serving as a simulcast of KANW. So KANM airs the news and talk format heard on KANW-HD2.

On February 6, 2021, KANW announced a collaboration with KEDP in Las Vegas, New Mexico. KEDP has been operated by New Mexico Highlands University since 1967. On February 9, an FCC application was filed to transfer the license of KEDP to the Albuquerque Board of Education.

On August 8, 2022, KXNM 88.7 Encino announced on their Facebook page that KANW would take over the operations of that station which served communities east of Albuquerque.

KANW HD2
KANW broadcasts a news, information and talk format on its HD2 digital subchannel. Programming comes from NPR, Public Radio International, American Public Media and BBC World Service. This format is available in Grants on FM translator station 91.1 K216AW and in Española on 91.1 K216GQ which upgraded its signal from 44 watts horizontal to 200 watts vertical in late summer 2015. On August 1, 2016, the format was made available in Albuquerque on translator 107.5 K298BY. In early 2017 the format was picked up on KDRI 90.3 in the Grants area which also continues to air on the 91.1 translator.

References

External links
KANW official website

 
 
 
 
 
 

ANW
Radio stations established in 1951
NPR member stations
1951 establishments in New Mexico